This is the discography of American R&B/pop singer-songwriter and actress Jessica Sanchez. she was the runner-up on the eleventh season of American Idol.

Two compilations of her performances from American Idol were released. The digital album, Jessica Sanchez: Journey to the Finale, was released on iTunes after the finale, and American Idol Season 11 Highlights was released in July 2012.  Her post-Idol debut studio album, Me, You and the Music was released in the United States on April 30, 2013. Her debut single "Tonight" features American R&B singer Ne-Yo, while the song's accompanying music video was shot in downtown Los Angeles on March 1, 2013, with director Justin Francis. The single released on March 22, 2013.

Albums

Studio albums

Compilation albums

Extended plays

Singles

As lead artist

As featured artist

Promotional recordings

Guest appearances

Music videos

References

Notes

American Idol discographies
Discographies of American artists
Pop music discographies